Second Sight: A Love Story is a 1984 television film starring Elizabeth Montgomery and Barry Newman. The film is based on the book Emma and I, by Sheila Hocken.

Plot 
A self-sufficient stubborn independent blind woman named Alexandra McKay (Montgomery), who has been blind for over 20 years, finally agrees to acquire a guide dog. She is worried that people will try to get close to her out of pity, so she distances herself emotionally from everyone, but becomes attached to her seeing-eye Labrador Retriever companion, Emma.

She meets Richard Chapman, who eventually becomes her boyfriend, and the new romance begins to pull Alexandra out of her shell. When the opportunity arises for a delicate operation that may restore her sight, Alexandra is alternately elated and scared. Richard convinces Alexandra to attempt the operation.

Cast and crew 
Elizabeth Montgomery as Alexandra McKay
Barry Newman as Richard Chapman
Nicholas Pryor as Mitchell McKay
Mitzi Hoag as Leslie McKay
Richard Romanus as Dr. Ross Harkin
Michael Horton as Gary Renzi
Liz Sheridan as Mrs. Carlisle
Susan Ruttan as Robin
Ben Marley as Michael
Frances Bay as Old Woman

External links 
 
 
O'Connor, John J., "Story of Blindness, Theme of Love", The New York Times, March 13, 1984

1984 films
1984 romantic drama films
1980s English-language films
American romantic drama films
Films directed by John Korty
1980s American films